Ellipsoptera lepida, the ghost tiger beetle, or the little white tiger beetle, is a species of flashy tiger beetle in the family Carabidae. It is found in Central America and North America. It is a state threatened species in Minnesota.

Description
The dorsal surface is white or cream, the head and thorax are green or reddish and covered with white setae, and the maculations are greatly expanded, leaving only small areas of white brown.

The species is active in the summer and it has a two-year life cycle.

Habitat
Its habitat is in pure white to pale yellow dry sandy areas with sparse or no vegetation. It is commonly found on coastal shorelines or large lake shores.

References

Further reading

 

Cicindelidae
Articles created by Qbugbot
Beetles described in 1831